Dänischenhagen is an Amt ("collective municipality") in the district of Rendsburg-Eckernförde, in Schleswig-Holstein, Germany. The seat of the Amt is in Dänischenhagen.

The Amt Dänischenhagen consists of the following municipalities:

Dänischenhagen (3.369) 
Noer (877) 
Schwedeneck (3.067) 
Strande (1.510)

Ämter in Schleswig-Holstein